Cryptochrysa is a monotypic moth genus of the family Erebidae erected by George Hampson in 1926. Its only species, Cryptochrysa auripennis, was first described by Schaus in 1912. It is found in Costa Rica.

References

Calpinae
Monotypic moth genera